Kazakh National Medical University is a university in Almaty, Kazakhstan. It was established in 1931, and the first rector was S.D. Asfendiyarov. In 2001, the government classified it as a "national" university.

The university has a student population of 11,000 students and PhD students study at KazNMU, and 1500 faculty members.

Faculties 
 General medicine faculty
 Therapeutic faculty
 Faculty of pediatrics
 Medico-prophylactic faculty
 Stomatology faculty
 Pharmacy faculty
 Faculty of management in Public Health and Pharmacy
 Postgraduate

Rectors
S. D. Asfendiyarov
E. H. Kasabulatov
F. H. Muhambetova
V. V. Zikeev
V. I. Zuzin
S. R. Karynbayev
S. M. Sidorov
I. S. Koryakin
R. I. Samarin
K. M. Maskeev
E. S. Belozerov
T. A. Muminov
A. A. Akanov 
T.S. Nurgozhin
M.E. Shoranov

References

Overview of Kazakh national medical university

External links
Official site
Journal "Vestnik KazNMU"

Universities in Kazakhstan
Buildings and structures in Almaty